Xi'an (153) is a Type 052C destroyer of the People's Liberation Army Navy. She was commissioned on 9 February 2015.

Development and design 

The Type 052C appears to share the same basic hull design as the Type 052B destroyer, which in turn is based on the Type 051B destroyer. Stealth features are incorporated. They uses predominantly Chinese systems derived from earlier foreign technology; the preceding Type 052 and Type 052B destroyers used a mixture of Russian and Chinese systems. 

The Type 052C propulsion is in the combined diesel or gas (CODOG) arrangement, with two Ukrainian DA80 gas turbines and two MTU 20V 956TB92 diesel engines. The DA80s had blade problems and may have contributed to the last two Type 052Cs sitting pierside at the shipyard for two years without being accepted by the PLAN. 

A Kamov Ka-28 or Harbin Z-9 helicopter may operate from the rear hangar and flight deck. The Ka-28 is equipped with a search radar and dipping sonar and can also employ sonobuoys, torpedoes, depth charges, or mines. The Z-9 is a variant of the Airbus Helicopters AS365 Dauphin. The naval variant of the Z-9, the Z-9C, is equipped with the KLC-1 search radar, dipping sonar, and is typically armed with a single, lightweight torpedo. Either helicopter significantly improves the anti-submarine capabilities of the Type 052C. 

The main gun is a  PJ-87. The gun suffered from jamming and may have influenced the decision to adopt a different weapon for the Type 052D destroyer. The weapon has a rate of fire of 25 rounds per minute. Close-in defence is provided by two seven-barrel  Type 730 CIWS, one mounted forward of the bridge and one atop the hangar. Each gun has a maximum rate of fire of 4200 rounds per minute.

Construction and career 
Xi'an was launched on 16 June 2012 at the Jiangnan Shipyard in Shanghai. Commissioned on 9 February 2015.

According to the Liberation Army Daily report on December 22, 2016, Xi'an encountered a foreign aircraft approaching in the East China Sea and warned and collected evidence in English. Xi’an was designated as the command ship of the Chinese formation participating in the 2016 RIMPAC. It participated in the exercise for 69 days and sailed for more than 15,000 nautical miles. It led the formation to complete 16 subject exercises in 3 categories of maritime blockade operations.

Gallery

References 

2012 ships
Ships built in China
Type 052C destroyers